Angel Baby is a 1995 Australian drama film written and directed by Michael Rymer and starring John Lynch, Jacqueline McKenzie and Colin Friels. The film was produced in 1993–94. It is a love story of two people with schizophrenia.

Premise
Harry (Lynch) and Kate (McKenzie) meet during therapy and fall passionately in love. They believe their love is so strong that it will allow them to go off their medication, and this is where their problems begin.

Awards
The film swept the boards at the 1995 AFI Awards winning all the major categories as well as several major international film festivals.

Box office
Angel Baby grossed $1,070,726 at the box office in Australia.

See also
 Wheel of Fortune (Australian game show) used as a plot element in this film.

References

External links
 
 
 Angel Baby at murdoch.edu.au
 Angel Baby at the National Film and Sound Archive

1995 drama films
1995 films
Australian drama films
Films directed by Michael Rymer
Films shot in Melbourne
Films shot in Adelaide
Films about schizophrenia
1995 directorial debut films
1990s English-language films